Bharath Reddy may refer to:

 Bharath Reddy (actor), Indian actor
 Bharath Reddy (cricketer), Indian cricketer